The 31st Biathlon World Championships were held in 1996 for the third time in Ruhpolding, Germany.

Men's results

20 km individual

10 km sprint

Team event

4 × 7.5 km relay

Women's results

15 km individual

7.5 km sprint

Team event

4 × 7.5 km relay

Medal table

References

1996
Biathlon World Championships
International sports competitions hosted by Germany
1996 in German sport
1996 in Bavaria
Biathlon competitions in Germany
February 1996 sports events in Europe
Sports competitions in Bavaria